Homaloxestis lochitis is a moth in the family Lecithoceridae. It was described by Edward Meyrick in 1918. It is found in southern India.

The wingspan is about 9 mm. The forewings are pale whitish ochreous with a black dot on the base of the costa. The discal stigmata are moderate and black, with a black dot on the dorsum beneath the second and small black marginal dots or marks around the posterior part of the costa and termen. The hindwings are light grey.

References

Moths described in 1918
Homaloxestis